Obrowo  is a village in the administrative district of Gmina Kęsowo, within Tuchola County, Kuyavian-Pomeranian Voivodeship, in north-central Poland. The village has a population of 160.

Geography

History
Obrowo formed a part of Royal Prussia, which had seceded from Teutonic Prussia in 1466 following the Second Peace of Thorn. In 1569 Royal Prussia merged in the Polish–Lithuanian Commonwealth. In 1772 in the course of the First Partition of Poland the Kingdom of Prussia seized Obrowo, with most of Royal Prussia, as ratified by the Partition Sejm in 1773. In 1871 the Kingdom of Prussia merged in the German Empire. After World War I Obrowo became part of the Second Polish Republic following the Peace of Versailles. During World War II Nazi Germany occupied and annexed Obrowo. This unilateral act was reversed by Germany's defeat in 1945.

References

Obrowo